John Mailer may refer to:
 John Mailer (footballer), Scottish footballer
 John Buffalo Mailer, American author, playwright, actor, producer, and journalist